Absard (also Romanized as Ābsard) is a village in Sefidar Rural District, Khafr District, Jahrom County, Fars Province, Iran. At the 2006 census, its population was 1,253, in 353 families.

References 

Populated places in  Jahrom County